Yamazaki Station may refer to:
Yamazaki Station (Aichi), on the Meitetsu Bisai Line in Inazawa, Aichi, Japan
Yamazaki Station (Kyoto), on the JR Kyoto Line (Tōkaidō Main Line) in Ōyamazaki, Kyoto, Japan

See also
Yamasaki Station, the Hakodate Main Line in Yakumo, Hokkaido, Japan
Mino-Yamazaki Station, on the Yoro Railway Yoro Line in Nannocho, Kaizu, Gifu, Japan